Marilyn Norry is a Canadian actress performing on stage across Canada and in films and television around the world.  Her credits include The L Word, Flight 93, and Stargate SG-1.

External links

Canadian film actresses
Canadian television actresses
Living people
20th-century Canadian actresses
21st-century Canadian actresses
Year of birth missing (living people)